The Bise (French: La Bise) is a cold, dry wind in Switzerland which blows through the Swiss Plateau from the northeast to the southwest.

Cause and effect
It is caused by canalisation of the air-current along the northern edge of the Alps, during high-pressure conditions in northern or eastern Europe. Towards western Swiss Plateau, the Bise is pressed between the Jura mountains and Pre-Alps whereby it strengthens and mostly climaxes on the western shore of Lake Geneva. In summer, the Bise wind causes rather dry and sunny weather whereas in winter, it frequently forms low stratus clouds over the Swiss Plateau by strengthening the inversion layer.

The Bise can sometimes lead to severe icing during winter months in Geneva and nearby communities. Many foreign travellers to this Swiss city have commented upon the Bise.

Measurement
The strength of the Bise wind can be determined by the analysis of the air pressure difference (in hectopascal [hPa]) between Geneva and Güttingen in canton of Thurgau. The Bise arises as soon as the air pressure in Güttingen (TG) is higher than in Geneva. The greater this air pressure difference, the stronger the Bise blows through the Swiss Plateau. In case of an inverted air pressure difference (low air pressure in Güttingen (TG) and high air pressure in Geneva), the opposite of Bise occurs: The wind blows from southwest through the Swiss Plateau.

Use and etymology
An alternative form in English is Biz. The term entered Middle English from French bise. Its origin is unknown.

The wind La Bise, along with Lake Geneva, is also mentioned in the song "Lonely Sky" which was penned and sung by the Irish singer Chris De Burgh. The song was released in 1975 on the album "Spanish Train and Other Stories".

References

Winds